This is an index of Microsoft Windows games.

This list has been split into multiple pages. Please use the Table of Contents to browse it.

<div style="max-width:115em; -width:100%">

References

Windows